Cherry Hill is a small campground/amusement park in Kaysville, Utah. The park opened for business on June 4, 1967 originally as just a campground. It later, based upon the popularity of it as a campsite, created some water attractions for its campers to enjoy in the summer season. It is mainly popular during the summer because of its main focus on water rides. The park also contains many other attractions such as miniature golf, a ball pit for kids, Basketball on Trampolines, a rock climbing wall, Bumper Boats, a Jungle Themed Maze and weekend concerts.

History
Before 1967 the land was 38 acres of a working cherry farm. Some of the trees, of the over 700 there, are still cherry trees. Grant S. Lloyd, the farmer born and raised there, received the property from his father who split the property in two to both of his sons. Grant got the southern portion, that was 2 acres larger than the northern portion, when he lost a coin toss to his brother who elected to take the northern half. Grant sold the sand from the extra 2 acres to the Utah Highway Department for .02 cents a yard so they widen Highway 89 nearby. He sold it with no regrets, as the sand from the 2 acres restricted the growth of his fruit trees. He realized he could make some greater profit on his land that would give him much more money than his farm. Now that he was near a busy interstate he partnered with a Chevron gas station that was built close by and teamed up with a restaurant to be built on his property for lease. As these things occurred he and his wife planned on constructing the campground and produce even more profit.

On June 4, 1967 the campground opened. Named "Crossroads Camping", it helped travelers with its food, cheap gas, and hospitality.

On June 10, 1978 Grant and Marry Lou opened up a 18 hole mini golf course, along with a game room and snack bar to accompany it. In 1980 the Lloyds built a two flume waterslide  measuring 375 feet long. In 1984 came a 6 cage batting room (Which was removed in 2014 along to make room for a Jungle Maze), and in 1985 the "Cardiac Canyon River Run" which was a tube water slide meant to simulate a turbulent river run.

By this time, Grant had passed the park on to his two sons Bruce and Keith, and in 1994 added Pirates Cove, a children's splash pad with a pirate theme featuring a 40 foot long mock pirate ship. In 2004 Bruce and Keith added a lazy river and named it Grant's Gulch after their father. This project came with 140 parking stalls, a new changing room, and a new snack bar. Since this time Bruce has passed day to day operations of the park onto his 2 sons Mitch and Jared Lloyd who run the park to this day

External links and References
Official Cherry Hill Website

1967 establishments in Utah
Amusement parks in Utah
Buildings and structures in Davis County, Utah
Tourist attractions in Davis County, Utah